Garmdarreh is a city in Alborz Province, Iran.

Garmdarreh or Garm Darreh may also refer to:
 Garmdarreh, Chaharmahal and Bakhtiari
 Garm Darreh, West Azerbaijan
 Garmdarreh Rural District, in Alborz Province